Quinclorac is a selective herbicide used primarily to control weeds in rice crops, but is also used on other agricultural crops and is found in some household herbicides for lawn use. Most lawn maintenance companies use the product for the control of annual grass weeds like crabgrass.

Quinclorac is considered a synthetic auxin.

References

External links
 

Auxinic herbicides
Quinolines
Chloroarenes
Carboxylic acids